Browns Creek is a stream in Garfield County, Utah, United States.

Browns Creek was named for Captain Brown, a "renegade" who camped nearby.

See also
List of rivers of Utah

References

Rivers of Garfield County, Utah
Rivers of Utah